Alexandr Yemelyanov (born January 1, 1984) is a Kazakhstani sprint canoeist. He competed at the 2016 Summer Olympics in the Canoeing at the 2016 Summer Olympics – Men's K-4 1000 metres race as part of the tenth-place Kazakhstan team.

References

External links
 

1984 births
Living people
Kazakhstani male canoeists
Olympic canoeists of Kazakhstan
Canoeists at the 2016 Summer Olympics
Asian Games gold medalists for Kazakhstan
Asian Games silver medalists for Kazakhstan
Asian Games bronze medalists for Kazakhstan
Asian Games medalists in canoeing
Canoeists at the 2002 Asian Games
Canoeists at the 2006 Asian Games
Canoeists at the 2010 Asian Games
Canoeists at the 2014 Asian Games
Medalists at the 2006 Asian Games
Medalists at the 2010 Asian Games
Medalists at the 2014 Asian Games